Pak Paeng-nyeon (박팽년, 朴彭年; 1417–1456) was a scholar-official of the early Joseon Dynasty, and is known as one of the six martyred ministers. He was born to a yangban family of the Suncheon Park clan, and was the son of high minister Park Jeong-rim.  He passed the lower national service examination at a royal visitation in 1434, and was later appointed to the Hall of Worthies by Sejong.  In the 1440s, he participated with other members of the Hall of Worthies in the creation of the Hunminjeongeum and the creation of the Hangul alphabet.  He passed the higher literary examination in 1447, and rose to vice-minister of justice under Danjong in 1454. He was an 8th cousin of Park Won-jong, the maternal uncle of Yun Im and Queen Janggyeong, the second wife of King Jungjong.

Biography 
In 1455, Danjong was overthrown by Sejo, arising the ire of Park and many other officials.  Park continued to serve in high office; he was appointed as governor of Chungcheong in 1455, and again as vice-minister of justice in 1456. He joined in a plot to overthrow Sejo and restore Danjong in 1456, but the plot was uncovered through the betrayal of fellow plotter Kim Jil.  Sejo admired Park's abilities and offered to pardon him if he were to deny his involvement and acknowledge Sejo as his king. When he refused to repent from his deeds, Sejo argued that it was useless to deny his authority now since Park had already called himself a "royal servant" and received royal grains from him. Park, however, denied this and it was indeed discovered that Park purposefully misspelled words "royal servant" in all of his reports (He wrote word meaning "huge"(巨) instead of "royal servant", 臣), and never used royal grains but instead stored them unused in a storage. Park died in prison from torture. All the males in his family were executed and females were enslaved.

A shrine to Park is located in Sinni-myeon, Chungju, Chungcheongbuk-do.  It was established in the 18th century, when Park and his fellows had come to be viewed as model subjects. Another memorial dating to 1688 stands in Jayang-dong, Dong-gu, Daejeon, at the former site of his official residence.  A few of Park’s sijo poems have survived.

Family 
 Father
 Park Jeong-rim (박중림)
 Sibling(s)
 Older sister - Lady Park of the Suncheon Park clan (순천 박씨, 順天 朴氏)
 Brother-in-law - Bong Yeo-hae (봉여해)
 Wives and their children
 Lady Kim of the Nakan Kim clan (낙안 김씨)
 Lady Jeon of the Cheonan Jeon clan (천안 전씨, 天安 全氏) 
 Son - Park Heon (박헌, 朴憲)
 Son - Park Sun (박순, 朴珣) (? - 1456)
 Son - Park Bun (박분, 朴苯)
 Grandson - Park Il-san (박일산)
 Daughter - Lady Park of the Suncheon Park clan (순천 박씨, 順天 朴氏)
 Son-in-law - Kim Ja-mu (김자무, 金自茂)
 Daughter - Lady Park of the Suncheon Park clan (순천 박씨, 順天 朴氏)
 Son-in-law - Yi Gong-rin (이공린, 李公麟)
 Daughter - Princess Consort Park of the Suncheon Park clan (군부인 순천 박씨, 郡夫人 順天朴氏)
 Son-in-law - Yi Jeon, Prince Yeongpung (영풍군 이전) (17 September 1434 - 1457/58)
 Granddaughter - Yi So-sa (이소사, 李召史)
 Adoptive grandson - Yi Ui (길안도정 이의)
 Adoptive grandson - Yi Bin, Prince Choiseong (취성군 이빈)

In popular culture
 Portrayed by Lee Won-woo in the 1994 KBS2 TV series Han Myeong-hoe
 Portrayed by Kim Ha-gyun in the 1998-2000 KBS1 TV series The King and the Queen
 Portrayed by Lee Yong-jin in the 2011 KBS TV series The Princess’ Man
 Portrayed by Kim Ki-bum in the 2011 SBS TV series Deep Rooted Tree.

See also
Joseon Dynasty politics
List of Joseon Dynasty people

References

External links
Information on the Daejeon monument to Pak

Joseon scholar-officials
1417 births
1456 deaths
Korean torture victims
Korean people who died in prison custody
Prisoners who died in Korean detention